The Way of the Scarlet Pimpernel, by Baroness Orczy, is another sequel book to the adventure tale, The Scarlet Pimpernel. First published in 1933, it is 6th in the series and one of the shorter Scarlet Pimpernel books. A French-language version, translated and adapted by Charlotte and Marie-Louise Desroyses, was also produced under the title Les Métamorphoses du Mouron Rouge.

The story features the Pimpernel's arch enemy Chauvelin as well as introducing the Austrian Baron de Batz, a real historical figure who also appears in Eldorado and Sir Percy Leads the Band.

1933 British novels
Scarlet Pimpernel books
Novels by Baroness Emma Orczy
Fiction set in 1792
Fiction set in 1793
Hodder & Stoughton books

de:The Scarlet Pimpernel
fr:Le Mouron rouge